Darwinia briggsiae is a plant in the myrtle family Myrtaceae and is endemic to New South Wales. It is an erect shrub with linear-shaped leaves and small groups of pink and white flowers.

Description
Flowering occurs from September to March.

Taxonomy and naming
Darwinia briggsiae was first formally described in 1991 by Lyndley Craven and S.R.Jones and the description was published in Australian Systematic Botany. The specific epithet (briggsiae) is in recognition of Australian botanist Barbara G. Briggs.

Distribution and habitat
This darwinia grows in heath and she-oak thickets in the Budawang Range and at Macquarie Pass.

References

Flora of New South Wales
Myrtales of Australia
briggsiae
Plants described in 1991